John Loker (born 1938) is a contemporary British abstract painter based in East Anglia and represented by Flowers Gallery, London and New York. Loker has numerous artworks in public and private collections, and has exhibited in some of the UK's major institutions since the 1970s.

Biography
John Loker was born in 1938 in Leeds. Loker studied graphic design at Bradford College of Art and Design between 1954 and 1958, where he befriended David Hockney, David Oxtoby, and Norman Stevens. The group of artists were known as the "Bradford Mafia" in the art world. In 1960 Loker moved to London to study painting at the Royal College of Art and graduated in 1963. The same year, Loker was awarded the Abbey Minor Travelling Scholarship.

Loker has exhibited in some of London’s major institutions, the Tate, Royal Academy of Arts, Barbican, as well as Cartwright Hall Gallery, Bradford, Walker Art Gallery (Liverpool), and in various galleries internationally. His works have been acquired by numerous institutions such as the Tate, Leeds Art Gallery and the Manchester Art Gallery.

Loker's first one-man exhibition "Horizontals and drawings" was held at Angela Flowers Gallery. London in October–November 1970. Flowers Gallery continues to regularly show Loker's work and plans to organise a solo exhibition in 2018 on the occasion of the artist's 80th birthday, in collaboration with Cartwright Hall Gallery, Bradford Museums.

John lives and works in East Anglia, UK, with partner and artist Emily Mayer.

Work
Loker has developed a personal language of painterly abstraction over four decades. Since the 1980s, he has introduced recognisable elements to his paintings such as windshield wipers, pylons, and whales' tails. These recurring motifs are part of an evolving vocabulary, designed to describe the infinite and ephemeral nature of experience, and the shifting balance of opposing forces. His sources of inspiration are varied and have included a 10-week long trip in Australia, the concept of rolling closure (when roads are closed on the occasion of a cycling race), NASA imagery, and metaphysical reflections on space and time.

Collections
Loker is represented in the following collections:

 Arts Council of Great Britain
 British Council 
 Contemporary Art Society 
 De Beers Department of the Environment 
 Deutsche Bank AG, London 
 Dudley City Art Gallery 
 Ferens Art Gallery, Hull 
 Hunterian Collection, Glasgow 
 IBM 
 Leeds City Art Gallery 
 Lloyds TSB Group PLC, London 
 Manchester City Art Gallery 
 Power Institute of Fine Art, Sydney 
 Rugby City Art Gallery 
 Tate Gallery 
 Unilever 
 Van Reekumgaler, Apeldoorn 
 Victoria and Albert Museum 
 Wakefield City Art Gallery 
 Worcester City Art Gallery

Commissions and awards
1994 Winner of the Nordstern Award for best print at the Royal Academy Summer Exhibition
1992 ITN building (Norman Foster), London. (Painting commissioned by Stanhope Developments)
1984 Essex General Hospital
1983 Watmoughs Holdings, Bradford

Further reading
 Ben Lewis: Horizons, Zones and Outer Spaces.The Art of John Loker. London, King, 2019.

References

External links
 John Loker, Tate
 John Loker, Arts Council Collection
 John Loker, Flowers Gallery
 John Loker, 'Space is a dangerous country', 2016, Catalogue published by Flowers Gallery
 John Loker

1938 births
Living people
20th-century English painters
21st-century English painters
Alumni of the Royal College of Art
Artists from Bradford
Artists from Leeds
English contemporary artists
English male painters
20th-century English male artists
21st-century English male artists